The George Hunt House is a historic building located southwest of Alpha at 135 Warren Glen Road in Pohatcong Township, Warren County, New Jersey. It was built  near the confluence of the Musconetcong River with the Delaware River. The house was added to the National Register of Historic Places on September 12, 1979, for its significance in architecture.

References

Pohatcong Township, New Jersey
National Register of Historic Places in Warren County, New Jersey
Houses on the National Register of Historic Places in New Jersey
New Jersey Register of Historic Places
Houses in Warren County, New Jersey
Stone houses in New Jersey
Houses completed in 1825